The Men's flyweight is a competition featured at the 2013 World Taekwondo Championships, and was held at the Exhibition Center of Puebla in Puebla, Mexico on July 15. Flyweights were limited to a maximum of 58 kilograms in body mass.

Medalists

Results
Legend
DQ — Won by disqualification
K — Won by knockout
P — Won by punitive declaration
R — Won by referee stop contest

Finals

Top half

Section 1

Section 2

Section 3

Section 4

Bottom half

Section 5

Section 6

Section 7

Section 8

References
Entry List
Results Book Pages 172–235

Men's 58